The 2012 Challenger Banque Nationale de Rimouski was a professional tennis tournament played on indoor hard courts. It was the 6th edition of the tournament and part of the 2012 ATP Challenger Tour, offering a total of $35,000 in prize money. It took place in Rimouski, Canada between March 19 and March 25, 2012.

Singles main-draw entrants

Seeds

1 Rankings are as of March 12, 2012

Other entrants
The following players received wildcards into the singles main draw:
 Philip Bester
 Samuel Monette
 Filip Peliwo
 Milan Pokrajac

The following players received entry from the qualifying draw:
 Devin Britton
 Austin Krajicek
 Haydn Lewis
 Clément Reix

Champions

Singles

 Vasek Pospisil def.  Maxime Authom, 7–6(8–6), 6–4

Doubles

 Tomasz Bednarek /  Olivier Charroin def.  Jaan-Frederik Brunken /  Stefan Seifert, 6–3, 6–2

External links
Official website

Challenger Banque Nationale de Rimouski
Challenger de Drummondville
Challenger Banque Nationale de Rimouski
Challenger Banque Nationale de Rimouski
Challenger Banque Nationale de Rimouski